Yermachikha is a rural locality (a selo) and the administrative center of Mamontovsky District, Altai Krai, Russia. The population was 394 in 2014. There are 7 streets.

Geography 
Yermachikha is located on the Yermachikha River, 53 km north of Mamontovo (the district's administrative centre) by road. Korchino is the nearest rural locality.

References 

Rural localities in Mamontovsky District